Buds Public School is K-12 school located in Dubai which follows a Central Board of Secondary Education, New Delhi curriculum.  The school was established in 1987. A 2013 report by Dubai's Knowledge and Human Development Authority (KHDA) stated that it had  an "acceptable" rating.

References

Buds Public School celebrates 25 years of educational service in Dubai, UAE.
http://gulf.manoramaonline.com/cgi-bin/MMOnline.dll/portal/ep/gulfContentView.do?contentId=13056956&programId=6722800&channelId=-1073869106&BV_ID=%40%40%40&tabId=15

External links
 Buds Public School

Schools in Dubai